Maze River may refer to:

 Maze River (Democratic Republic of the Congo)
 Maze River (Ethiopia)
 Maze River (Japan)

See also 
 Maze (disambiguation)